Frank Richter (born January 5, 1952) is a German former footballer.

Club career 
The forward played more than 130 East German top-flight matches.

International career 
Richter's seven full international were mostly played against Latin American opposition.

References

External links
 
 

1952 births
Living people
German footballers
East German footballers
East Germany international footballers
East Germany under-21 international footballers
Dynamo Dresden players
DDR-Oberliga players
Association football forwards